Sergey Martynov (Russian: Сергей Александрович Мартынов; born 22 August 1959) is a Russian politician who serves as a senator from Mari El since 7 October 2019.

As of October 19, 2022, Martynov was under personal sanctions introduced by the European Union, the United Kingdom, the USA, Canada, Switzerland, Australia, Ukraine, New Zealand, for ratifying the decisions of the "Treaty of Friendship, Cooperation and Mutual Assistance between the Russian Federation and the Donetsk People's Republic and between the Russian Federation and the Luhansk People's Republic"and providing political and economic support for Russia's annexation of Ukrainian territories.

Biography

Martynov was born on 22 August 1959 in Shatki, Nizhny Novgorod Oblast. In 1982, he graduated from the Peter the Great St. Petersburg Polytechnic University. In 2002, he also received a degree from Northwestern Management Institute. From 1982 to 1984, he served in the Soviet Armed Forces. From 1985 to 2000, he served in the KGB. In 2003–2010, he was the Head of the Human Resources and Public Service Administration of the Governor of St. Petersburg Valentina Matviyenko. From 2014 to 2019, he also was the Head of the Federation Council. On 7 October 2019, he became the Senator from Mari El.

References

Living people
1959 births
United Russia politicians
21st-century Russian politicians
People from Nizhny Novgorod Oblast
Members of the Federation Council of Russia (after 2000)